The Torneo Gran Alternativa (2012) (Spanish for "Great Alternative Tournament") was the 2012 version of Consejo Mundial de Lucha Libre's (CMLL) Torneo Gran Alternativa, a tournament they had held almost every year since 1994. The 2012 version was the eighteenth Torneo Gran Alternativa and was  held in March and April 2012. The tournament consisted of 16 tag teams, composed of a Novato (rookie) and a veteran wrestler, who may not normally team up.

Block A, which was won by the team of Euforia and El Terrible, took place on March 30, 2012, and Block B, which was won by Atlantis and Tritón, took place on April 6. The finals of the tournament were held on April 13 and were won by Euforia and El Terrible. the victory was the impetus for Euforia later joining Los Guerreros del Infierno ("The Warriors from the Inferno"). The Gan Alternativa also saw another chapter in a long-running feud between El Terrible and Rush as they met in one of the semi-final matches.

History
Starting in 1994 the Mexican professional wrestling promotion Consejo Mundial de Lucha Libre (CMLL) created a special tournament concept where they would team up a novato, or rookie, with a veteran for a single-elimination tag team tournament. The tournament was called El Torneo Gran Alternativa, or "the Great Alternative Tournament" and became a recurring event on the CMLL calendar. CMLL did not hold a Gran Alternativa tournament in 1997 and 2000 held on each year from 2001 through 2012. The 2012 Gran Alternativa tournament was the 18th overall Gran Alternativa tournament. All tournaments have been held in Arena México, CMLL's main venue and as part of the CMLL Super Viernes show.

Tournament background

The tournament featured 15 professional wrestling matches with different wrestlers teaming up, some of which were involved in pre-existing scripted feuds or storylines while others were simply paired up for the tournament. Wrestlers portrayed either villains (referred to as Rudos in Mexico) or fan favorites (Técnicos in Mexico) as they competed in wrestling matches with pre-determined outcomes. The tournament format followed CMLL's traditional tournament formats, with two qualifying blocks of eight teams that competed on the first and second week of the tournament and a final match between the two block winners. The qualifying blocks were one-fall matches while the tournament finals will be a best two-out-of-three falls tag team match. Each qualifying block started with all eight Novatos in the block competing in a "seeding" battle royal to determine the brackets for the block.

2012 Gran Alternativa participants

Raziel was billed as a rookie for the 2012 tournament, ignoring the fact that he had been a professional wrestler for 16 tears at the time of the tournament. He had previous worked as Caligula but in late 2009 was given a new name and mask, with no acknowledgement of his previous identity. At 39 years of age Raziel became the oldest "rookie" to compete in a Gran Alternativa tournament. Tritón had been part of the 2011 CMLL Torneo Gran Alternativa tournament, using the name "Metal Blanco", something CMLL did not refer to in 2012. Among the veterans the biggest ongoing storyline was the feud between Rush and El Terrible, who were both in Block A, expecting to clash at some point during the first night of the tournament.

The field featured several former tournament winners, including Rey Escorpión and Último Guerrero who had won the 2011 Gran Alternativa as a team, as well as Negro Casa, the first rookie winner in 1994. Previous winners Rey Bucanero, Blue Panther, El Felino, and La Máscara also competed.

Tournament results
As predicted El Terrible and Rush, with their respective partners, faced off in the semi-finals after each team won their first two matches. In the end, Euforia and El Terrible defeated Rush and his brother Dragon Lee when Rush returned to the ring after being eliminated. Block B did not have a favorite going into the tournament, with no existing story lines driving the block. In the end Atlantis and Tritón defeated Raziel and Volador Jr. to qualify for the finale the following week. The finals of the tournament were held on April 13 and saw Euforia and El Terrible win the match and thus the tournament.

Tournament brackets

Tournament shows
March 30, 2012 Super Viernes

April 6, 2012 Super Viernes

April 13, 2012 Super Viernes

Aftermath
A few months after his Gran Alternativa win Euforia was made a member of Los Guerreros del Infierno, Infierno]], CMLL's top rudo faction. In 2014 Euforia teamed up with Atlantis to win that year's Torneo Nacional de Parejas Increibles ("National Incredible pairs tournament"). Euforia, Niebla Roja and Último Guerrero defeated Los Estetas del Aire (Máscara Dorada, Místico and Valiente) to win the CMLL World Trios Championship.

El Terrible's long-running feud with Rush continued throughout most of 2012, including Rush, Marco Corleone and Maximo (collectively known as El Bufete del Amor; "The Law of Love") successfully defending the CMLL World Trios Championship against La Fuerza TRT, El Terrible, Rey Bucanero and Tiger in the main event of the 56. Aniversario de Arena México show. Later on El Terrible would defeat Rush in the finals of the 2012 Universarl Championship tournament. The feud culminated in the main event of the CMLL 79th Anniversary Show where Rush defeated El Terrible in a Lucha de Apuestas, or "bet match", after which El Terrible was shaved bald as a result.

The Dragon Lee that participated in the 2014 Gran Alternativa'' tournament was not the same as the 2012 Dragon Lee, but his younger brother who had taken over the character after the original Dragon Lee became the new Mistico.

References

2012 in professional wrestling
CMLL Torneo Gran Alternativa
March 2012 events in Mexico
April 2012 events in Mexico